"Antología" is a song by Colombian singer-songwriter Shakira, taken from her third studio album Pies Descalzos. It was released in 1997 by Sony Music and Columbia Records as the fifth single from the album. The song was written and produced by Shakira, with additional production from Luis Fernando Ochoa. "Antología" is a Latin pop ballad that lyrically discusses an appreciation for the knowledge a lover has shared. It is one of Shakira's signature songs in Latin America.

Background
In 1990, a thirteen-year-old Shakira signed a recording contract with Sony Music and released her debut studio album Magia in 1991, which largely consisted of tracks she had written since she was eight years old. Commercially, the project struggled, selling an underwhelming 1,200 copies in her native Colombia. Her follow-up record Peligro was released in 1993, and suffered a similar failure. Consequently, Shakira took a two-year hiatus, allowing her to complete her high school education.

Looking to revive her struggling career, Shakira released her first major-label studio album Pies Descalzos in 1996 by Sony Music and Columbia Records.  Assuming a prominent position in its production, she co-wrote and co-produced each of the eleven tracks included on the record. Serviced as the fifth single from the project, "Antología" saw additional production from Luis Fernando Ochoa. The track is heavily influenced by Latin pop elements, and makes use of prominent guitar instrumentation. Lyrically, it discusses an appreciation of the knowledge a lover has shared.

Charts

References

External links
 SHAKIRA, CON LOS PIES DESCALZOS - Archivo - Archivo Digital de Noticias de Colombia y el Mundo desde 1.990 - eltiempo.com

1990s ballads
Spanish-language songs
Shakira songs
1998 singles
Pop ballads
Songs written by Shakira
Songs written by Luis Fernando Ochoa